Raymond "Ray" Owen (birth registered third ¼ 1940 – 5 February 2006) was an English professional rugby league footballer who played in the 1960s, and a chairman of the 1980s and 1990s.

Background
Ray Owen's birth was registered in Prescot district, Lancashire, England, and he died aged 65 in Widnes, Cheshire, England.

Playing career

Championship final appearances
Ray Owen played , scored a try, and was man of the match winning the Harry Sunderland Trophy, in Wakefield Trinity's 21-9 victory over St. Helens in the Championship Final replay during the 1966–67 season at Station Road, Swinton on Wednesday 10 May 1967, and scored two tries in the 17-10 victory over Hull Kingston Rovers in the Championship Final during the 1967–68 season at Headingley Rugby Stadium, Leeds on Saturday 4 May 1968.

Challenge Cup Final appearances
Ray Owen played  in Widnes' 13-5 victory over Hull Kingston Rovers in the 1963–64 Challenge Cup Final during the 1963–64 season at Wembley Stadium, London on Saturday 9 May 1964, in front of a crowd of 84,488, and played  in Wakefield Trinity's 10-11 defeat by Leeds in the 1968 Challenge Cup "Watersplash" Final during the 1967–68 season at Wembley Stadium, London on Saturday 11 May 1968, in front of a crowd of 87,100.

County Cup Final appearances
Ray Owen played  in Wakefield Trinity's 18-2 victory over Leeds in the 1964 Yorkshire County Cup Final during the 1964–65 season at Fartown Ground, Huddersfield on Saturday 31 October 1964.

Club career
Ray Owen made his début for Wakefield Trinity during August 1964, and he played his last match for Wakefield Trinity during the 1968–69 season, he appears to have scored no drop-goals (or field-goals as they are currently known in Australasia), but prior to the 1974–75 season all goals, whether; conversions, penalties, or drop-goals, scored 2-points, consequently prior to this date drop-goals were often not explicitly documented, therefore '0' drop-goals may indicate drop-goals not recorded, rather than no drop-goals scored.

Rugby league career
Ray Owen was chairman of Widnes during the glory years of the 1980s, and was still involved, as chairman of the Widnes Past Players Association, up to his death.

Genealogical information
Ray Owen was the son of the rugby league footballer Harry Owen, and Margaret (née Leather, birth registered during third ¼ 1912 in Prescot district), the younger brother of the rugby league footballer for Widnes, and Liverpool City, Harry Owen, Jr. (birth registered during fourth ¼ 1932 in Prescot district), and the older brother of Christine Owen (birth registered during first ¼  in Prescot district), and David Owen (birth registered during second ¼  in Prescot district)

References

External links
Search for "Owen" at rugbyleagueproject.org
Ex-Vikings chief dies
Football: Ray Was a True Great; Tributes Pour in for Popular Widnes Chief
Football: Ray Was a True Great; Tributes Pour in for Popular Widnes Chief
Rugby Cup Final 1968

1940 births
2006 deaths
English rugby league players
Rugby league halfbacks
Rugby league players from Prescot
Wakefield Trinity players
Widnes Vikings players